Pleasant Mound Township may refer to the following places in the United States:

 Pleasant Mound Township, Bond County, Illinois
 Pleasant Mound Township, Blue Earth County, Minnesota

See also

Pleasant Hill Township (disambiguation)

Township name disambiguation pages